52975 Cyllarus , prov. designation: , is a very red centaur, approximately  in diameter, orbiting the Sun in the outer Solar System. It was discovered on 12 October 1998, by American astronomer Nichole Danzl at the Kitt Peak National Observatory near Sells, Arizona, in the United States. It was later named after the mythological creature Cyllarus.

Orbit and classification 

Cyllarus orbits the Sun in the outer main-belt at a distance of 16.3–36.0 AU once every 133 years and 5 months (48,739 days). Its orbit has an eccentricity of 0.38 and an inclination of 13° with respect to the ecliptic. Cyllarus came to perihelion in September 1989. The body's observation arc begins with its official discovery observation at Kitt Peak, as no precoveries were taken, and no prior identifications were made.

Naming 

This minor planet was named for the Cyllarus, a centaur of Greek mythology. The official  was published by the Minor Planet Center on 14 June 2003.

A symbol derived from that for 2060 Chiron, was devised in the late 1990s by German astrologer Robert von Heeren. It replaces Chiron's K with a CY for Cyllarus.

Physical characteristics 

As of 2017, no rotational lightcurve has been obtained from photometric observations. The body's rotation period and shape, as well as its spectral type remains unknown. It is a red centaur with (RR), and has an absolute magnitude of 9.4.

See also

References

External links 
 Dictionary of Minor Planet Names, Google books
 Asteroids and comets rotation curves, CdR – Observatoire de Genève, Raoul Behrend
 Discovery Circumstances: Numbered Minor Planets (50001)-(55000) – Minor Planet Center
 

Centaurs (small Solar System bodies)
Discoveries by Nichole M. Danzl
Named minor planets
19981012